

Offseason
Aug. 31, 2011: Senior goaltender Genevieve Lacasse has completed her first tournament with the Canada’s National women’s ice hockey team. She won two of three games at the 2011 IIHF 12 Nations Tournament. She let in four goals while stopping six shots in a 6-4 loss to Sweden. Earlier in the tournament, she shut out Slovakia. This marked her fourth-consecutive shutout in international competition (dating back to the 2011 MLP Cup when she played with the Canadian Under 22 team).

Recruiting

Exhibition

Regular season
The 17th Annual Mayor's Cup took place on November 25 versus the Brown Bears.
December 22: In recognition of the ten-year anniversary of the Women's Hockey East Association, the Friars announced their Providence Hockey East All-Decade Team. Six forwards, five defenders and two goalies were honored.

January 10: The Dartmouth Big Green and Providence Friars played each other in an outdoor game at Fenway Park in Boston. Providence skater Brooke Simpson scored her first career NCAA goal. With 1:14 remaining in regulation, Big Green forward Camille Dumais scored the game-winning goal on Providence netminder Genevieve Lacasse as the Big Green prevailed by a 3-2 mark.
On January 28 and 29, Lacasse stopped 51 of 53 shots in a Friars sweep of the Connecticut Huskies. With the two victories, Lacasse surpassed Jana Bugden as the Friars all-time wins leader with 59. Her shutout on January 28 was the 17th of her Friars career, a new record.

Standings

Schedule

Conference record

Awards and honors
Nicole Anderson, Hockey East Co-Player of the Week (Week of November 28, 2011)
Beth Hanrahan, Hockey East Co-Rookie of the Week (Week of October 24, 2011)
Genevieve Lacasse, Hockey East Defensive Player of the Week (Week of January 31, 2011) 
Nina Riley, Hockey East Defensive Player of the Week (Week of January 9. 2012) 
Laura Verahanta, Hockey East Player of the Week (Week of November 7, 2011)

References

Providence
Providence Friars women's ice hockey seasons
Providence
Providence